Ogorzelec may refer to the following places in Poland:
Ogorzelec, Kamienna Góra County in Gmina Kamienna Góra, Kamienna Góra County in Lower Silesian Voivodeship (SW Poland)
Ogorzelec, Polkowice County in Gmina Grębocice, Polkowice County in Lower Silesian Voivodeship (SW Poland)